The 2004 Tercera División play-offs to Segunda División B from Tercera División (Promotion play-offs) were the final playoffs for the promotion from 2003–04 Tercera División to 2004–05 Segunda División B. The first four teams in each group (excluding reserve teams) took part in the competition.

Promotion to Segunda División B

Groups A
Teams from Galicia, Asturias, Castile and Leon and Madrid.

Group A1
1st Eliminatory:

2nd Eliminatory:

Promoted to Segunda División B:Navalcarnero

Group A2
1st Eliminatory:

2nd Eliminatory:

Promoted to Segunda División B:Atlético Arteixo

Group A3
1st Eliminatory:

2nd Eliminatory:

Promoted to Segunda División B:Marino de Luanco

Group A4
1st Eliminatory:

2nd Eliminatory:

Promoted to Segunda División B:Guijuelo

Groups B
Teams from Cantabria, Basque Country, La Rioja/Navarre and Aragon.

Group B1
1st Eliminatory:

2nd Eliminatory:

Promoted to Segunda División B:Huesca

Group B2
1st Eliminatory:

2nd Eliminatory:

Promoted to Segunda División B:Sestao River Club

Group B3
1st Eliminatory:

2nd Eliminatory:

Promoted to Segunda División B:Peralta

Group B4
1st Eliminatory:

2nd Eliminatory:

Promoted to Segunda División B:Lemona

Groups C
Teams from Catalonia, Valencian Community, Balearic Islands and Region of Murcia.

Group C1
1st Eliminatory:

2nd Eliminatory:

Promoted to Segunda División B:Badalona

Group C2
1st Eliminatory:

2nd Eliminatory:

Promoted to Segunda División B:Benidorm

Group C3
1st Eliminatory:

2nd Eliminatory:

Promoted to Segunda División B:Levante B

Group C4
1st Eliminatory:

2nd Eliminatory:

Promoted to Segunda División B:Alcoyano

Groups D
Teams from Andalusia, Extremadura, and Castile-La Mancha.

Group D1
1st Eliminatory:

{| width=100% cellspacing=1
!width=20%|
!width=12%|
!width=20%|
!
|-
|June 13, 2004

Away Matches:
|- style=font-size:90%
|align=right|Granada
|align=center|3-2
|La Roda
|Agg:3-3
|- style=font-size:90%
|align=right|Díter Zafra
|align=center|2-1|Balompédica Linense
|Agg:3-2|}2nd Eliminatory:Promoted to Segunda División B:Díter Zafra

Group D21st Eliminatory:2nd Eliminatory:Promoted to Segunda División B:CD Alcalá

Group D31st Eliminatory:2nd Eliminatory:Promoted to Segunda División B:Don Benito

Group D41st Eliminatory:2nd Eliminatory:'''Promoted to Segunda División B:Arenas''

Group E
Teams from Canary Islands.

Promotion to Tercera: Berceo
Relegation to Regional: Alberite

External links
Futbolme.com

2003-04
play
2004 Spanish football leagues play-offs